Don Pedro Island State Recreation Area is a state park in the U.S. state of Florida. It is located on a stretch of Don Pedro Island, a  barrier island lying across the Intracoastal Waterway from Placida in Charlotte County, between Palm Island and Little Gasparilla Island. The park has mangrove forests, dunes and white beaches. Activities include swimming, sunbathing, shelling and viewing nature. Among the wildlife of the park are loggerhead turtles. Amenities include beaches, docks, and picnic areas as well as guided nature talks and walks. The park is only accessible by boat and is open from 8:00 am till sundown year round. The easiest way to get there is Palm Island Transit. The location of the Palm Island Transit is 2000 Panama Boulevard, Englewood, Florida.

Gallery

References

External links

 Don Pedro Island State Park at Florida State Parks
 Don Pedro Island State Recreation Area at Absolutely Florida
 Don Pedro Island State Recreation Area at Wildernet

State parks of Florida
Parks in Charlotte County, Florida
Beaches of Florida
Protected areas established in 1985
1985 establishments in Florida
Beaches of Charlotte County, Florida